Ryanair UK is a British low-cost airline with its second base at Stansted Airport. The airline is the UK subsidiary of the low-cost Irish airline group Ryanair Holdings, and a sister airline to Ryanair, Buzz and Malta Air. It commenced operations in March 2019.

History

Ryanair UK was founded on 30 May 1985 as Dawndell Limited and was renamed Ryan Air UK Limited on 27 June 1985. Since 1 November 1995 the company is called Ryanair UK Limited.

In a statement dated 2 January 2018, Ryanair announced that its subsidiary Ryanair UK filed an application with the Civil Aviation Authority for an air operator's certificate on 21 December 2017, in anticipation of a potential "hard Brexit". Its first Boeing 737-800, registered as G-RUKA, was transferred to Ryanair UK in December 2018. The airline received an air operator's certificate from the Civil Aviation Authority on 3 January 2019 and commenced operations on behalf of Ryanair on 12 March 2019. Ryanair UK received its second 737-800 ex Buzz SP-RKA now registered as G-RUKB, registering it on 10 March 2021. On 13 October, Ryanair UK received its third aircraft, registering it G-RUKC. A 4th aircraft arrived a week later, registered G-RUKD, having also been transferred from parent company Ryanair. Further aircraft will continue to be transferred in the future.

Fleet
As of March 2023, the Ryanair UK fleet consists of the following aircraft:

Note

References

External links
 ryanair.com

UK
Airlines of the United Kingdom
Airlines established in 1985
British companies established in 1985
British subsidiaries of foreign companies
1985 establishments in England
Companies based in Essex